WLTN is an American radio station licensed by the Federal Communications Commission (FCC) to serve the community of Littleton, New Hampshire, where the transmitter is also located.

Current programming
WLTN is affiliated with CBS News Radio and airs newscasts every hour.  WLTN is a broadcast outlet for Boston Red Sox baseball, through the Red Sox Radio Network.

History
The first FCC license renewal online shows that in 1982 WLTN was licensed to Profile Broadcasting Company. The station featured a news/talk format throughout the 1990s and early 2000s until Sharp Broadcasting (who had acquired the station in 1999 from Profile) transferred control (via local marketing agreement) to Barry Lunderville and changed formats to oldies. In June 2005 the license was transferred to Lunderville.

Translators
In addition to the main station, WLTN is relayed by FM translators.

References

External links

WLTN AM Anchorman Dies

LTN
Oldies radio stations in the United States
Radio stations established in 1963
Littleton, New Hampshire
1963 establishments in New Hampshire